Kleinheubach is a market community in the Miltenberg district in the Regierungsbezirk of Lower Franconia (Unterfranken) in Bavaria, Germany and the seat of the like-named Verwaltungsgemeinschaft (municipal association). It has a population of around 3,600.

Geography

Location 
Kleinheubach lies between the Spessart and Odenwald ranges, on the left bank of the Main. Across the river lies Grossheubach, linked to Kleinheubach by a bridge. Upstream the closest town is Miltenberg. The municipal territory touches on the state of Hesse in the far west.

Neighbouring communities
Kleinheubach borders on (from the north, clockwise): Grossheubach, Miltenberg, Rüdenau, Michelstadt (in Hesse) and Laudenbach.

History 
Like many other towns in Germany, Kleinheubach had a vibrant Jewish community for many centuries. The Jewish community became organized in the second half of the 17th century and built synagogue and cemetery, and in the early 1900s also built a school. Their synagogue was desecrated on Kristallnacht (9 November 1938).

Since 1976, Kleinheubach has been associated with Laudenbach and Rüdenau in a Verwaltungsgemeinschaft (municipal association).

Government

Community council 
The council is made up of 17 council members, counting the mayor.

(as at municipal election held on 2 March 2008)

Mayors 
Thomas Münig (SPD) was elected mayor in March 2020.

Former mayors:
 Jakob Zink: 1933–1945
 Heinrich Jäger: 1946–1966
 Heinrich Morgenroth: 1966–1968
 Theodor Lippert: 1968–1978
 Bernhard Holl: 1978–1990
 Kurt Schüßler: 1990–2008
 Stefan Danninger: 2008–2020

Coat of arms 
The community’s arms might be described thus: Argent on a mount of three Or a lion rampant gules armed and langued of the second.

The lordship of Kleinheubach passed after the Counts of Rieneck died out in 1559 to the Counts of Erbach, and again in 1731, through sale, to the Princes of Löwenstein-Wertheim-Rosenberg. At the time of sale, the Princes had to promise that this Protestant place would be allowed unhindered to keep the Augsburg Confession even under their Catholic rule. They had a stately palace built by Johann Dientzenhofer on the site of the former castle, which is still owned by the family today. The lion is taken from this princely family’s arms, in a somewhat simplified form, as it has appeared there since about 1518. The market community’s seal is known from imprints between 1810 and 1840, and shows the same composition, although the lion is in some cases on flat ground rather than the “mount of three” (or Dreiberg, as this device is called in German heraldry).

The arms have been borne since the 19th century.

Attractions
 Löwenstein Castle, palace of the Princes of Löwenstein-Wertheim-Rosenberg

Infrastructure

Transport 
 runs through the community's territory. Kleinheubach is located on the Main Valley Railway.

Notable people

Sons and daughters of the town 
 Joseph von Schork (b. 7 December 1829; d. 25 January 1905), Roman Catholic Archbishop of the Archbishopric of Bamberg from 1890 to 1905
  (b. 17 June 1849; d. 14 May 1932 in Berlin), German scholar of jurisprudence and politician (DVP), Member of the Reichstag, President of the Deutscher Juristentag
Aloys, 7th Prince of Löwenstein-Wertheim-Rosenberg (b. 15 September 1871; d. 25 January 1952),  German nobleman and politician
Karl II, 8th Prince of Löwenstein-Wertheim-Rosenberg (b. 8 February 1904; d. 23 August 1990), German nobleman
  (b. 7 June 1927; d. 25 January 2009 in Furtwangen), social scientist and clock historian
Princess Adelaide (b. 3 April 1831; d. 3 December 1909 in Ryde), Princess of luxembourg
Torsten Fenslau (b. 23 April 1964; d. 6. November 1993 in Darmstadt), music producer and disc jockey

References

External links 

 Community’s official webpage 
 Map of Kleinheubach

Miltenberg (district)